Australoricus oculatus is a species of Loricifera, a species of microscopic marine sediment-dwelling animals, in the family Nanaloricidae. It is the only described species in the genus Australoricus. It was discovered in sea caves off New South Wales in Australia.

References

Loricifera
Fauna of New South Wales
Endemic fauna of Australia
Monotypic protostome genera